Samea ecclesialis is a moth in the family Crambidae. It is found in Argentina, Brazil, Bolivia, Colombia, Ecuador, French Guiana, Panama, Costa Rica, Mexico and the United States, where it has been recorded from North Carolina to Florida, west to Texas.

Adults are on wing nearly year-round in the southern part of the range.

References

Spilomelinae
Moths described in 1854